Goebel Leon Reeves (October 9, 1899 – January 26, 1959) was an American folk singer.  His most famous song is "Hobo's Lullaby", which has been covered by various singers, especially Woody Guthrie. Among other artists who later performed the song were Woody Guthrie's son Arlo, Emmylou Harris, David Carradine and Billy Bragg with Joe Henry. A 2016 article in the Los Angeles Times said the song is "one of the most disarmingly endearing train songs ever written", and is "inextricably linked with American folk music icon Woody Guthrie".

Early life
Born October 9, 1899, in Sherman, Texas, Reeves grew up in Austin.

Notes

External links
 [ Biographical sketch of Goebel Reeves] from AllMusic
 Somewhat longer biography of Reeves from The Encyclopedia of Popular Music by Colin Larkin
 Summary of CD Hobo's Lullaby with tracks listed and a brief biographical sketch of Reeves from County Sales vendor website
 

1899 births
1959 deaths
People from Sherman, Texas
American folk singers
Industrial Workers of the World members
20th-century American singers
People from Bell Gardens, California